A list of films produced in Hong Kong in 1988:.

1988

References

External links
 IMDB list of Hong Kong films
 Hong Kong films of 1988 at HKcinemamagic.com

1988
Hong Kong
1988 in Hong Kong